This page lists the compositions of Johann Ludwig Krebs as compiled by Felix Friedrich in the Krebs-Werkeverzeichnis (Krebs Works Catalogue).

The catalogue is divided into nine sections by category, with each work assigned a Krebs-WV number (sometimes seen as KrebsWV or KWV in recordings and other sources).  Unassigned numbers were left at the end of each section to accommodate future discoveries or attributions while maintaining the category structure.

The order within each category is not chronological, as many of Krebs' works cannot be dated.  The order within published collections, such as the Clavier-Übung, was maintained.

Questions of authorship were addressed in several ways.  A number of anonymous works were listed in the final section (Krebs-WV 9xx) that have been attributed to Krebs but cannot be verified.  There are also a number of works that are ascribed to Krebs and other composers in various sources.  These were included in the main sections but noted as such.

The Eight Short Preludes and Fugues, originally attributed to Johann Sebastian Bach as BWV 553–560, were not included in the Krebs-WV. The authorship of these pieces has been debated for many years, with Krebs, his father Johann Tobias Krebs and other students of Bach suggested as the true author. Friedrich decided not to include the pieces in the catalogue, noting that recent scholarship, including the critical reports submitted for the New Bach Edition, has viewed Krebs's authorship with extreme doubt, and that no new insights on the issue have emerged in recent years.

Masses, cantatas, motets and arias (Krebs-WV 1xx)

Orchestral works (Krebs-WV 2xx)

Chamber music (Krebs-WV 3xx)

Free organ works (Krebs-WV 4xx)

Organ works based on chorales (Krebs-WV 5xx)

Free works for organ and a second instrument (Krebs-WV 6xx)

Works based on chorales for organ and a second instrument (Krebs-WV 7xx)

Keyboard works (Krebs-WV 8xx)

Doubtful works (Krebs-WV 9xx)

Lost works

Notes

References

Sources
 
Emans, Reinmar 1997. Johann Sebastian Bach, Organ Chorales of Dubious Authenticity: Thematic Catalogue. Das Institut, Göttingen, Germany.
Emans, Reinmar (ed.) 2008. Bach: Organ Chorales from Miscellaneous Sources, Band 10 of the New Bach Edition. Bärenreiter, Kassel, Germany.
Friedrich, Felix 2009. Krebs-Werkeverzeichnis (Krebs-WV) : Thematisch-systematisches Verzeichnis der musikalischen Werke von Johann Ludwig Krebs. Verlag Kamprad, Altenburg, Germany. 
 
Weinberger, Gerhard (ed.) 1985-6. Johann Ludwig Krebs: Sämtliche Orgelwerke. Published in four volumes. Breitkopf & Härtel, Wiesbaden, Germany.
Weinberger, Gerhard 2001-2007. Liner notes to Krebs: Sämtliche Orgelwerke, 7 CD compilation, Motette.

External links

Krebs, Johann Ludwig, list of compositions by